R. Balakrishnan, popularly known as R. Balki, (born 16 April 1964) is an Indian filmmaker, screenwriter and former Group Chairman of the advertising agency Lowe Lintas (India). He is best known for directing Cheeni Kum (2007), Paa (2009), Pad Man (2018) and Chup: Revenge of The Artist (2022).

Career
He started, his career with Mudra at the age of 23. His passion had always been filmmaking. After college, he even applied to the Chennai Film Institute to do a course in direction. However, he did not like the panel that interviewed him, so he walked out. Not knowing what to do and having always been interested in Computers, he joined the newly begun Masters in Computer Application course at the Guindy College of Engineering, close to the film institute. After studying there for three years, he didn't complete the course due to lack of attendance. According to him, this was mainly because he spent his time playing cricket and watching films.

One day, he saw an advertisement in the papers by Mudra Communications. He had no idea about the company except the fact that their logo appeared after every episode of Buniyaad. And so he thought it was Ramesh Sippy's (the maker of Buniyaad) company. The advert asked people to send in 100 words describing who they were. He was selected for the first creative training programme by the agency. A programme that was like testing model for the agency for the creation of MICA years later.

Balki was soon addicted to advertising. Balki's ideas have included "Daag Achche Hain" for Surf Excel, "Jaago re" ads for Tata Tea, "What an idea sirji" Idea Cellular advertising campaign, Havells, Tanishq, ICICI Prudential, Saint-Gobain glass, Hamara Bajaj, Britannia, Pepsodent and many more.

Balki has written and directed the much enjoyed Cheeni Kum (2007), which starred Amitabh Bachchan and Tabu. His second feature film was the critically acclaimed and commercially successful Paa, (produced by Sunil Manchanda and Abhishek Bachchan), released on 4 December 2009, starring Amitabh Bachchan, his son Abhishek, and Vidya Balan. Shamitabh was his third Bollywood venture starring Amitabh Bachchan, southern superstar Dhanush and Akshara Haasan, who made her debut in the film. The film released on 6 February 2015. He then wrote and directed Ki and Ka which was released on 1 April 2016 starring Kareena Kapoor and Arjun Kapoor. His next was Pad Man which starred Akshay Kumar and Radhika Apte, released February 2018, based on the life of Arunachalam Muruganantham, which he co-produced, wrote and directed. In 2019 Balki co-produced and wrote Mission Mangal where he also played the role of creative director. His next directorial was the thriller film Chup : Revenge Of The Artist, released on 23 September 2022, starring Sunny Deol, Dulquer Salmaan and Shreya Dhanwanthary in lead roles. The film focused on a serial killer who targets film critics. 

Ilaiyaraaja, the noted Indian composer, is his favourite composer. Balki once commented, "My biggest inspiration has been Ilaiyaraaja's music; it was his music that got me interested in cinema in the first place." He has collaborated with P. C. Sreeram, India's premier cinematographer in all his films, an association that Balki cherishes deeply.

Personal life
Balki has been married to Gauri Shinde since 2007. She is an Indian advertising professional and a screen writer, director and producer.

Filmography

Awards and nominations
Paa received 14 nominations at the 16th Star Screen Awards and won five awards of those. It also won National Film Award for Best Feature Film in Hindi.

For Pad Man, he won Best Director award in Indian Film Festival of Melbourne 2018. It also won the Best film on social issues at the 66th National Film Awards.

References

External links

 
 Paa official website

1965 births
Living people
Film directors from Tamil Nadu
Hindi-language film directors
Indian advertising directors
Indian male screenwriters
21st-century Indian film directors
Directors who won the Best Film on Other Social Issues National Film Award
People from Thanjavur district